"Vavoom: Ted the Mechanic" is the first song on Purpendicular, Deep Purple's first studio album featuring guitarist Steve Morse. The song is notable for its use of pinch harmonics. It remained as the first song in the band's live sets after the album's release so that Morse could start the show by playing the first notes of the new album.

Vocalist Ian Gillan has stated that the lyrics are based on the true-life story of a man he once met in a pub during the recording sessions for the 1987 album The House of Blue Light. The two started talking, and Gillan wrote down the man's story on some napkins which he then put away and forgot about. He discovered them years later and they became the basis for the lyrics of "Vavoom: Ted the Mechanic". The song was a live staple during the Purpendicular tour, and was also played during more recent tours as well.

The "Vavoom" in the song's title comes from the end of each verse, where Gillan says the word, leading into the chorus. On all live albums that feature the song, though, the title is simply listed as "Ted the Mechanic".

Personnel
Ian Gillan – vocals
Steve Morse – guitar
Roger Glover – bass
Jon Lord – organ
Ian Paice – drums

References 

Deep Purple songs
Songs written by Ian Gillan
Songs written by Roger Glover
Songs written by Jon Lord
Songs written by Ian Paice
Songs written by Steve Morse
1996 songs